Catalina Corró (born 14 April 1995) is a Spanish swimmer. She competed in the women's 400 metre freestyle event at the 2018 FINA World Swimming Championships (25 m), in Hangzhou, China.

References

External links
 

1995 births
Living people
Spanish female medley swimmers
Spanish female freestyle swimmers
Swimmers at the 2013 Mediterranean Games
Swimmers at the 2018 Mediterranean Games
Mediterranean Games medalists in swimming
Mediterranean Games gold medalists for Spain
Mediterranean Games silver medalists for Spain
Place of birth missing (living people)
People from Inca, Mallorca
Sportspeople from Mallorca